Irbe is a Latvian feminine given name and a Latvian surname.
The associated name day is March 20.

Notable people with the surname Irbe include:
 Artūrs Irbe (born 1967), Latvian ice hockey coach and former goaltender
 Kārlis Irbe (1861–1934), bishop of the Evangelical Lutheran Church of Latvia
Voldemārs Irbe (1893–1944), Latvian pastelist

Fictional characters
Gintars Irbe, protagonist of Gintars episode of American sitcom Brooklyn Nine-Nine

See also

Iribe

References 

Latvian feminine given names
Latvian-language surnames